Sturrock is a surname. Notable people with the name include:

Archibald Sturrock (1816–1909), Scottish mechanical engineer
Blair Sturrock (born 1981), Scottish soccer player
David Sturrock (born 1938), Scottish-born soccer player
Ian Sturrock, British botanist specialising in orchards and apple trees
Jock Sturrock (1915–1997), Australian yachtsman
John Sturrock (disambiguation), several people
John Leng Sturrock (1878–1943), Scottish newspaper publisher and politician
Kathron Sturrock, British pianist
Paul Sturrock (born 1956), Scottish soccer manager
Peter Sturrock (MP) (1820–1904), Scottish civil engineer, colliery owner and politician
Peter A. Sturrock (born 1924), British astrophysicist